The A4144 road is an A road in Oxford, England. It links Upper Wolvercote in the north and Redbridge in the south via central Oxford.

The A4144 consists largely of Woodstock Road in the north and Abingdon Road in the south. It also includes Beaumont Street, St Giles' and part of Worcester Street.

Much of the A4144 is the former route of the A34 road, which used to pass through central Oxford until 1962 when the Western Bypass Road was completed.

References

Roads in Oxfordshire
Transport in Oxford